Sin Nombre (Spanish for 'without name') may refer to:

A placeholder name in Spanish
Sin Nombre orthohantavirus, the prototypical etiologic agent of hantavirus cardiopulmonary syndrome (HCPS)
Sin nombre (film), a 2009 film by Cary Joji Fukunaga
The Nameless (film), a 1999 film also known in Spanish as Los Sin Nombre